"Ma philosophie" is a 2004 song recorded by Amel Bent as her debut single, from her album Un Jour d'été. It was released on 29 November 2004 in France, and remains the singer's most successful song, topping the charts in France and Belgium (Wallonia).

Lyrics, music and video
Written by Blair MacKichan and arranged by Diam's, the song has lyrics that reveal the positive sides of women.

The music video deals with the various types of women and shows Amel Bent alternately as a businesswoman, a materialistic woman, a waitress and a daily woman who is with her friends. The lyrics have a quasi-poetic feel to them, as figurative language is sparsely used, such as the metaphor "Je suis l’as qui bat le roi" and the alliteration of the "i" sound in "injures incessantes".
"My Philosophy" was named the Victoires de la Musique as 'Original song of the Year'.

The song was covered by Karen Mulder, Corneille, Lorie, Sandrine Kiberlain, Julie Zenatti and Hélène Ségara for Les Enfoirés' album 2006: Le Village des Enfoirés (seventh track). The song has been parodied by Paral & Piped studio, under the title "Ma Seule Envie".

Chart performances
In France, the single went straight to number one SNEP Singles Chart on 23 January 2005, staying there for six consecutive weeks. It remained for 12 weeks in the top ten, then did not stop to drop quickly on the chart, totaling 15 in the top 50 and 18 weeks on the chart (top 100). It was ranked third on the Annual Chart and achieved Diamond status. As of August 2014, the song was the 18th best-selling single of the 21st century in France, with 569,000 units sold.

The single featured for 24 weeks on the Ultratop 40, from 19 February 2005. It debuted at number 21, then climbed to number three and reached number one during the following weeks, staying there for seven consecutive weeks. It appeared in the top ten for 16 weeks, was certified Gold disc, and was the third best-selling single of 2004.

Track listings
 CD single
 "Ma philosophie" — 3:26
 "As" with Julien Chagnon — 4:36

 Digital download
 "Ma philosophie" — 3:26
 "As" with Julien Chagnon — 4:36

Charts and sales

Weekly charts

Year-end charts

Certifications

References

2004 songs
Amel Bent songs
Ultratop 50 Singles (Wallonia) number-one singles
SNEP Top Singles number-one singles
2005 debut singles
Songs written by Diam's